
Draper & Folsom (ca.1778–1783) were publishers in Boston, Massachusetts during the American Revolution. They printed works by William Billings, John Lathrop, and others. Around 1778, Edward Draper (d.1831) and John West Folsom (d.1825) formed a partnership as printers. They began working "at their printing-office, near the Lamb Tavern, Newbury-Street" (i.e. Washington Street); later in 1778 they moved to Winter Street. They issued numerous titles, including the weekly newspaper Independent Ledger and the American Advertiser. "The partnership between Draper & Folsom was dissolved on Nov. 3, 1783."

References

Further reading

Published by Draper and Folsom
 Independent Ledger and the American Advertiser (June 15, 1778 – October 16, 1786)
 Treaties, of amity and commerce, and of alliance eventual and defensive, between His Most Christian Majesty and the thirteen United States of America (reprint). 1778.
 William Billings. The singing master's assistant, or Key to practical music : Being an abridgement from The New-England psalm-singer; together with several other tunes, never before published. June, 1778. Engraved by Benjamin Pierpont.
 Samuel West. An anniversary sermon, preached at Plymouth, December 22d, 1777; In grateful memory of the first landing of our pious New-England ancestors in that place, A.D. 1620. 1778.
 John Lathrop. A discourse, preached on March the fifth, 1778. 1778.
 The last words and dying speech of James Buchanan, Ezra Ross and William Brooks : who are executed this day at Worcester, for the murder of Mr. Joshua Spooner. 1778.
 An almanack, for the year of our Lord and Saviour Christ 1779 : Being the third after bissextile or leap year, and the third of American independence. Containing (besides what belongs to an almanack) a variety of other matter, useful and entertaining. 1778.
 Moses Everett. Early piety recommended : A sermon, preached Lord's-Day evening, February 1, 1778. To two religious societies of young men in Dorchester. 1779.
 Ethan Allen. A narrative of Col. Ethan Allen's captivity: from the time of his being taken by the British, near Montreal, on the 25th day of September, in the year 1775, to the time of his exchange, on the 6th day of May, 1778: containing his voyages and travels ... Interspersed with some political observations (reprint). 1779.
 Benjamin Foster. The washing of regeneration, or, The Divine rite of immersion; and a letter to the Reverend Mr. Fish, on "Japheth yet dwelling in the tents of Shem." 1779.
 Bickerstaff's Boston almanack, for the year of our redemption, 1780. 1779.
 Isaac Backus. Policy, as well as honesty, forbids the use of secular force in religious affairs. 1779.

1778 establishments in Massachusetts
1783 disestablishments in the United States
18th century in Boston